Tolne is a small village and railway town in Vendsyssel, Denmark. It is located in Hjørring Municipality in Region Nordjylland. Its population was 209 as of 2015. It is located in Tolne Hills, a popular excursion trip destination.

Tolne is served by Tolne railway station, located on the Vendsyssel railway line between Aalborg and Frederikshavn.

References 

Cities and towns in the North Jutland Region
Hjørring Municipality